Makur is both a given name and a surname. Notable people with the name include:

 John Marik Makur, South Sudanese politician
 Makur Maker (born 2000), South Sudanese-Australian basketball player

African given names